There are at least 26 named mountains in McCone County, Montana.
 Andrews Hill, el. 
 Bald Butte, el. 
 Big Butte, el. 
 Big Heaven, el. 
 Bonhoff Butte, el. 
 Caprock Butte, el. 
 Chalk Butte, el. 
 Coal Hill, el. 
 Cobb Hill, el. 
 Corner Butte, el. 
 Deadman Butte, el. 
 Devils Table Rock, el. 
 Goat Mountain, el. 
 Indian Hill, el. 
 Little Heaven, el. 
 Lower Summit, el. 
 Lucky Hill, el. 
 Lytle Hill, el. 
 Maxwell Hill, el. 
 McDonald Butte, el. 
 Rocky Butte, el. 
 Stony Butte Hill, el. 
 Teton Butte, el. 
 Vanderhoof Hill, el. 
 Westland Hill, el. 
 Willis Buttes, el.

See also
 List of mountains in Montana
 List of mountain ranges in Montana

Notes

McCone